Blagoveshchenskoye is a rural locality (a selo) in Borisoglebskoye Rural Settlement, Muromsky District, Vladimir Oblast, Russia. The population was 116 as of 2010. There are 3 streets.

Geography 
Blagoveshchenskoye is located on the left bank of the Oka River, 53 km north of Murom (the district's administrative centre) by road. Poltso is the nearest rural locality.

References 

Rural localities in Muromsky District
Muromsky Uyezd